Ecological collapse refers to a situation where an ecosystem suffers a drastic, possibly permanent, reduction in carrying capacity for all organisms, often resulting in mass extinction. Usually, an ecological collapse is precipitated by a disastrous event occurring on a short time scale. Ecological collapse can be considered as a consequence of ecosystem collapse on the biotic elements that depended on the original ecosystem.

Ecosystems have the ability to rebound from a disruptive agent. The difference between collapse or a gentle rebound is determined by two factors—the toxicity of the introduced element and the resiliency of the original ecosystem.

Through natural selection the planet's species have continuously adapted to change through variation in their biological composition and distribution. Mathematically it can be demonstrated that greater numbers of different biological factors tend to dampen fluctuations in each of the individual factors.

Scientists can predict tipping points for ecological collapse. The most frequently used model for predicting food web collapse is called R50, which is a reliable measurement model for food web robustness.

Causes and examples
Although there is no single cause for ecological collapse, attributing factors include asteroid impacts, extremely large volcanic eruptions, and abrupt climate change. The snowball effect of these attributing factors and ecological collapse are demonstrated within the fossil record. Prehistoric examples include the Carboniferous Rainforest Collapse, the Cretaceous–Paleogene extinction event, the Permian–Triassic extinction event, and other mass extinctions. For example, effects of climate change as a contributing factor towards ecological collapse are demonstrated in the Ordovician–Silurian extinction events. A possible cause of the Ordovician Extinction was global cooling which affected the habitats of marine life. Consequently, sea creatures such as trilobites, brachiopods, and graptolites became extinct. Furthermore, Karabonov and colleagues conducted a study to show how during the Last Glacial Maximum (LGM), alternations in the environment and climate led to ecological collapse in Lake Baikal and Lake Hovsgol which then led to species evolution in these systems. The collapse of Hovsgol's ecosystem during the LGM brought forth a new ecosystem, with limited biodiversity in species and low levels of endemism, in Hovsgol during the Holocene. Karabonov's study also shows that ecological collapse during LGM in Lake Hovsgol led to higher levels of diversity and higher levels of endemism as a byproduct of evolution following the ecological collapse of the LGM. The Ordovician Extinction event and Lake Baikal and Hovsgol demonstrate two effects of ecological collapse on prehistoric environments.

Historic examples include the collapse of the Grand Banks cod in the early 1990s, attributed to overfishing.

Important pressures contributing to current and future ecological collapse include habitat loss, degradation, and fragmentation, overgrazing, overexploitation of ecosystems by humans, human industrial growth and overpopulation, climate change, ocean acidification, pollution, and invasive species.

Rainforest collapse

Rainforest collapse refers to the actual past and theoretical future ecological collapse of rainforests. It may involve habitat fragmentation to the point where little rainforest biome is left, and rainforest species only survive in isolated refugia. Habitat fragmentation can be caused by roads. When humans start to cut down the trees for logging, secondary roads are created that will go unused after its primary use. Once abandoned, the plants of the rainforest will find it difficult to grow back in that area. Forest fragmentation also opens the path for illegal hunting. Species have a hard time finding a new place to settle in these fragments causing ecological collapse. This leads to extinction of many animals in the rainforest.

Carboniferous period 

In the Carboniferous period, coal forests, great tropical wetlands, extended over much of Euramerica (Europe and America). This land supported towering lycopsids which fragmented and collapsed abruptly. The collapse of the rainforests during the Carboniferous has been attributed to multiple causes, including climate change and volcanism. Specifically, at this time climate became cooler and drier, conditions that are not favourable to the growth of rainforests and much of the biodiversity within them. The sudden collapse in the terrestrial environment made many large vascular plants, giant arthropods, and diverse amphibians to go extinct, allowing seed-bearing plants and amniotes to take over (but smaller relatives of the affected ones survived also).

Today

Terrestrial examples
A classic pattern of forest fragmentation is occurring in many rainforests including those of the Amazon, specifically a 'fishbone' pattern formed by the development of roads into the forest. This is of great concern, not only because of the loss of a biome with many untapped resources and wholesale death of living organisms, but also because plant and animal species extinction is known to correlate with habitat fragmentation.

Overgrazing was found to cause land degradation, specifically in Southern Europe, which is another driver of ecological collapse and natural landscape loss. Proper management of pastoral landscapes can mitigate risk of desertification.

Oceans
In 2010  of oil was dumped into the Gulf of Mexico when BP's Deepwater Horizon oil rig exploded. The effects of the BP oil spill will continue to be felt by future generations, as contamination has been found throughout the entire food chain. More than 8,000 marine birds, sea turtles and marine mammals were found dead or injured within months of the clean up effort. The impact of this disaster has unbalanced the food web of the environment. The oil spill occurred at the height of breeding season and as result affected egg and larval animals to the worst extent wiping entire age classes. This loss of a generation down the line will prove dire for future predators of the ecosystem.

In addition, a major concern for marine biologists is the effects of ecological collapse on the coral reefs (who based on fossil evidence are more vulnerable to extinction but also demonstrate greater resilience). An effect of global climate change is the rising sea levels which can lead to reef drowning or coral bleaching. Human activity, such as fishing, mining, deforestation, etc., serves as a threat for coral reefs by affecting the niche of the coral reefs. For example, Edinger and colleagues demonstrate a correlation between a loss in diversity of coral reefs by 30-60% and human activity such as sewage and/or industrial pollution.

The world ocean is in great danger of collapse. In a study of 154 different marine fish species, David Byler found out that many factors such as overfishing, climate change, and fast growth of fish populations will cause ecosystem collapse. When humans fish, they usually will fish the populations of the higher trophic levels such as salmon and tuna. The depletion of these trophic levels allow the lower trophic level to overpopulate, or populate very rapidly. For example, when the population of catfish is depleting due to overfishing, plankton will then overpopulate because their natural predator is being killed off. This causes an issue called eutrophication. Since the population all consumes oxygen the dissolved oxygen levels will plummet. The dissolved oxygen levels dropping will cause all the species in that area to have to leave, or they will suffocate. This along with climate change, and ocean acidification can cause the collapse of an ecosystem.

Scientific research
Some scientists predict that a global ecological collapse will occur after 50% of the natural landscape is gone due to human development. There is evidence that even large ecosystems can collapse on relatively short timescales, disproportionately faster than smaller ecosystems. A paper suggests that once a 'point of no return' is reached, breakdowns do not occur gradually but rapidly and that the Amazon rainforest could shift to a savannah-type mixture of trees and grass within 50 years and the Caribbean coral reefs could collapse within 15 years once a state of collapse has been reached.

Consequences 
Although the causes of ecological collapse are due to factors unique to their environment, they all for the most part share similar ramifications such as loss in biodiversity, trophic cascades, and even extinction. For example, the urbanization and deforestation of the South east Asian Pacific has led to the extinction of three plant species and eight animal species in 2003.

See also
 Arctic shrinkage
 Ecological resilience
 Ecosystem collapse
 Ecosystem services
 Environmental degradation
 Global catastrophic risks § Ecological disaster
 Malthusian catastrophe
 Overshoot (ecology)
 Tipping points in the climate system

References

Biological systems
Doomsday scenarios
Societal collapse